Valêncio Xavier Niculitcheff (21 March 1933 — 5 December 2008) was a Brazilian writer, screenwriter, film and television director. He was known by his experimental writing, mixing verbal and visual languages; among them O mez da grippe, a novella set in Curitiba during the 1918 influenza outbreak.

Life and career 
Born in São Paulo, Valêncio moved to Curitiba at the age of 21.  There he worked at TV Paranaense (now RPC TV) and at Rede Tupi's affiliate, TV Paraná (now CNT).  In this medium, he wrote dramas and even directed episodes of Globo Repórter.

Behind the cameras, he served as director, assistant director, editor, screenwriter and consultant.  He directed films such as: "O Pão Negro - An Episode of Colônia Cecília" from 1993 and "Os 11 de Curitiba, Todos Nós", among others.  He received the award for "Best Fiction Film" at the IX Brazilian Short Film Journey, for "Caro Signore Feline" in 1980.

Together with Francisco Alves dos Santos, he created, in 1975, the Cinemateca de Curitiba, linked to the Cultural Foundation.  He also served as director in museums and cultural spaces in the capital.

Valêncio Xavier wrote short stories in newspapers and magazines, such as: Nicolau, Revista USP and Folha de S. Paulo cultural section Mais!.  He was a columnist for the newspaper Gazeta do Povo from 1995 to 2003.

Works
 7 de Amor e Violência (anthology) – 1964;
 Desembrulhando as Balas Zequinha – 1973
 Curitiba, de Nós (with Poty Lazzarotto) – 1975;
 O Mez da Grippe – 1981;
 Maciste no Inferno – 1983;
  O Minotauro – 1985;
  O Mistério da Prostituta Japonesa & Mimi-Nashi-Oichi – 1986;
 A Propósito de Figurinhas (with Poty Lazzarotto) – 1986;
 Poty, Trilhas e Traços (a biography of Poty Lazzarotto) – 1994;
 Meu 7º dia – 1998;
 Minha Mãe Morrendo e o Menino Mentido – 2001
  Crimes à Moda Antiga – 2004, entre outros.

References

1933 births
2008 deaths
Brazilian male short story writers
Brazilian screenwriters
20th-century Brazilian male writers
20th-century Brazilian short story writers
20th-century screenwriters